A 2021 Tour Card is needed to compete in Professional Darts Corporation ProTour tournaments.

In total 128 players are granted Tour Cards, which enables them to participate in all Players Championships and European Tour Qualifiers.

Most Tour Cards are valid for 2 years. The top 64 in the PDC Order of Merit all receive Tour Cards automatically, and those who won a two-year card in 2020 still had a valid card for 2021. The top 2 of the 2019 Challenge Tour and Development Tour also won cards. The remaining places will be awarded at the 2021 Q-Schools, with the final four days of competition awarding one Tour Card per day from the UK Q-School and the European Q-School; with the remaining players being ranked and the top players also receiving Tour Cards. All players who won a card at either Q-School had their Order of Merit ranking reset to zero.

Harry Ward and Kyle Anderson resigned their cards after the 2021 PDC World Darts Championship, which allowed Mark McGeeney and Maik Kuivenhoven to move into the top 64 and retain their Tour Cards.

Andy Boulton also switched his allegiance from England to Scotland on residency grounds.

Tour Cards per Nationes

See also
List of darts players
List of darts players who have switched organisation

References 

2021 PDC Pro Tour
2021 in darts
Lists of darts players